The Yugoslavia Fed Cup team represented SFR Yugoslavia in Fed Cup tennis competition and was governed by the Yugoslav Tennis Association. With the dissolution of Yugoslavia, the team no longer exists.

History
Yugoslavia competed in its first Fed Cup in 1969 against United States in Greece; and lost 3-0. It reached the semifinals in 1984, with Sabrina Goleš, Mima Jaušovec, and Renata Šašak, in the team.

Successors
 (1992-)
 (1992-)
 (1995-2003) /  (2004-2006)
 (2007-)
 (2007-)
 (1995-)
 (1997-)

See also
Fed Cup
Yugoslavia Davis Cup team

References

External links
Fed Cup profile

Fed Cup
Billie Jean King Cup teams